Paul Payne (born 6 March 1965) is a former Australian rules footballer who played with Melbourne and Carlton in the Victorian Football League (VFL). Beginning his career with Melbourne, Payne spent four seasons with the Demons before retiring from football to join the police force. Carlton convinced him to come out of retirement and he spent one season with the Blues in 1989 before being delisted at the end of the season.

Notes

External links

Paul Payne's profile at Blueseum
Paul Payne's profile at Demonwiki

1965 births
Carlton Football Club players
Melbourne Football Club players
Tatura Football Club players
Living people
Australian rules footballers from Victoria (Australia)